Vitali Aleksandrovich Burmakov (born 30 June 1987) is a Russian former professional football player.

Club career
He played 4 seasons in the Russian Football National League for FC KAMAZ Naberezhnye Chelny, FC Sodovik Sterlitamak and FC Chernomorets Novorossiysk.

External links
 
 
 Career summary by sportbox.ru

1987 births
People from Dimitrovgrad, Russia
Living people
Russian footballers
Association football forwards
FC KAMAZ Naberezhnye Chelny players
FC Rostov players
FC Sodovik Sterlitamak players
FC Chernomorets Novorossiysk players
FC Lukhovitsy players
FC Lada-Tolyatti players
FC Volga Ulyanovsk players
Sportspeople from Ulyanovsk Oblast